Trần Bích San (陳璧山, 1840–1877) was a famous Vietnamese scholar and writer. The New Orleans-based Vietnamese writer Tran Bich San is his great-grandson.

References

1840 births
1877 deaths
Nguyễn dynasty writers